Khazret Sultan (in Uzbek Hazrati Sulton choʻqqisi) is a mountain and the highest point of Uzbekistan, with an elevation of . It is located on the border of Uzbekistan and Tajikistan, in Surxondaryo Region, in the Uzbek part of the Gissar Range. This mountain was formerly known as Peak of the 22nd Congress of the Communist Party.

See also 
 Geography of Uzbekistan
 List of mountains of Tajikistan
 List of elevation extremes by country

References

External links 
  Central Asia Mountain Climbing, Central Asia Mountaineering Agency.
  Initial Communication of the Republic of Uzbekistan - Geographic Situation and Climate, page 17.

Mountains of Tajikistan
Mountains of Uzbekistan
Tajikistan–Uzbekistan border
International mountains of Asia
Highest points of countries
Four-thousanders of the Pamir